The Hessel is a , right tributary of the River Ems in the territory of the North Rhine-Westphalian districts of Gütersloh and Warendorf in northwest Germany.

The river rises northwest of Halle (Westf.) on the Große Egge, crosses the Hermannsweg, flows through the villages of Hesseln and Hörste in Halle borough, then through the borough of Versmold through Oesterweg, continuing through the town of Sassenberg and along the southern edge of Milte in the borough of Warendorf, before emptying into the Ems near Warendorf-Einen.

Tributaries include the Casumer Bach, Bruchbach, Aabach, Poggenfahrtgraben, Sandfortbach, Teichwiese, Wöstenbach, Beckstroth, Arenbecke and the Speckengraben.

The Snake's Head Meadows lie along the Hessel near Sassenberg, one of the few areas in Germany in which this strictly protected wildflower occurs.

References 

Rivers of North Rhine-Westphalia
Gütersloh (district)
Warendorf (district)
Rivers of Germany